Milner is an unincorporated community in Routt County, Colorado, United States.

Description
Milner lies in the Mountain Time Zone (MST/MDT) and observes daylight saving time. The settlement is located along U.S. Hwy 40 between the nearby communities of Craig and Steamboat Springs.

See also

References

External links

Unincorporated communities in Routt County, Colorado
Unincorporated communities in Colorado